Witold Lesiewicz (9 September 1922 – 23 March 2012) was a Polish film director and screenwriter. He directed 24 films between 1949 and 1979. He completed the work on the 1963 film Passenger after the death of director Andrzej Munk.

Selected filmography
 Deserter (1958)
 Rok pierwszy (1960)
 Kwiecień (1961)
 Passenger (1963)
 Nieznany (1964)
 Bolesław Śmiały (1971)
 Doctor Murek (1979)

References

External links

1922 births
2012 deaths
Polish film directors
Polish screenwriters
People from Białystok
People from Białystok Voivodeship (1919–1939)